The 1898 Stanford football team represented Stanford University in the 1898 college football season and was coached by Harry P. Cross in the second of his two nonconsecutive seasons with the team. He also coached the 1896 team. Stanford suffered its first Big Game loss to California, a 22–0 shutout.

Schedule

References

Stanford
Stanford Cardinal football seasons
Stanford football